The canton of Sarlat-la-Canéda is an administrative division of the Dordogne department, southwestern France. Its borders were modified at the French canton reorganisation which came into effect in March 2015. Its seat is in Sarlat-la-Canéda.

It consists of the following communes:

Beynac-et-Cazenac
Marcillac-Saint-Quentin
Marquay
Proissans
La Roque-Gageac
Saint-André-d'Allas
Sainte-Nathalène
Saint-Vincent-de-Cosse
Saint-Vincent-le-Paluel
Sarlat-la-Canéda
Tamniès
Vézac
Vitrac

References

Cantons of Dordogne